Kochnev or Kotchnev is a Russian masculine surname, its feminine counterpart is Kochneva or Kotchneva. It may refer to
Aleksandr Kochnev (born 1987), Russian football player 
Anna Kotchneva (born 1970), Soviet rhythmic gymnast
Yuri Kochnev (born 1942), Russian conductor of classical music

Russian-language surnames